The Battle of Tom's Brook was fought on October 9, 1864, in Shenandoah County, Virginia, during Philip Sheridan's Shenandoah Valley Campaign of the American Civil War. It resulted in a significant Union victory, one that was mockingly dubbed The Woodstock Races for the speed of the Confederate withdrawal.

After his victory at Fisher's Hill, Maj. Gen. Philip Sheridan pursued Jubal A. Early's Confederate army up the Shenandoah Valley to near Staunton. On October 6, Sheridan began withdrawing, as his cavalry burned everything that could be deemed of military significance, including barns and mills. Reinforced by Maj. Gen. Joseph B. Kershaw's division, Early followed. Maj. Gen. Thomas L. Rosser arrived from Petersburg to take command of Maj. Gen. Fitzhugh Lee's Confederate cavalry division and harassed the retreating Federals. On October 9, Brig. Gen. Alfred Torbert's Union troopers turned on their pursuers, routing the divisions of Rosser, whose cavalrymen were repulsed by Custer in a flanking maneuver along the base of Spiker's Hill off of Back Road, and Lunsford L. Lomax, who was positioned in the vicinity of the Valley Pike, at Tom's Brook. With this victory, the Union cavalry attained overwhelming superiority in the Valley.

Jubal Early later commented sourly about Rosser's Laurel Brigade, "The laurel is a running vine".

Battlefield preservation
The Civil War Trust (a division of the American Battlefield Trust) and its partners have acquired and preserved  of the Tom's Brook battlefield.

See also

Edward R. Hanford – Union private, capturer of the 32nd Battalion Virginia Cavalry battle flag

References

 National Park Service Battle Summary
 CWSAC Report Update

Further reading
 Miller, William J. Decision at Tom's Brook: George Custer, Thomas Rosser, and the Joy of the Fight. El Dorado Hills, CA: Savas Beatie, 2016. .

Shenandoah County in the American Civil War
Valley campaigns of 1864
Battles of the Eastern Theater of the American Civil War
Union victories of the American Civil War
Tom's Brook
Conflicts in 1864
1864 in Virginia
October 1864 events